Deadly Nightshade is a 1953 British crime drama film directed by John Gilling. It stars Emrys Jones, Zena Marshall and John Horsely. A convict on the run (Emrys Jones) switches identities with a lookalike, only to find himself in even deeper trouble.

Cast
Emrys Jones as Matthews / Barlow
Zena Marshall as Ann Farrington
John Horsely as Inspector Clements
Joan Hickson as Mrs. Fenton
Hector Ross as Canning
Roger Maxwell as Col. Smythe
Lesley Deane as Mrs. Smythe		
Marne Maitland as Heinz
Frederick Piper as Mr. Pritchard

Critical reception
TV Guide thought the idea was "done much better in Antonioni's The Passenger (1975)," but found the film, "still occasionally entertaining"; while the Radio Times wrote, "In spite of its penury, this typical 1950s British crime quickie...is curiously engaging...Although director John Gilling throws in a few Cornish coastal views, he's mostly confined to unconvincing sets, though the cheapskate look only adds to the charm."

References

External links

1953 films
British crime drama films
1953 crime drama films
Films directed by John Gilling
Film noir
British black-and-white films
1950s English-language films
1950s British films